Sucheng Chan (born 1941) is a Chinese-American author, historian, scholar, and  professor. She established the first full-fledged autonomous Department of Asian American Studies at a major U.S. research university and she was the first Asian American woman in the University of California system to hold the title of provost.

Chan was born in Shanghai, China in 1941. Her family moved to Hong Kong in 1949, to Malaysia in 1950, and to the US in 1957. She received a bachelor's degree at Swarthmore College (Economics, 1963), a master's degree at the University of Hawaii (Asian Studies, 1965), and a Ph.D. at University of California, Berkeley (Political Science, 1973). She married Mark Juergensmeyer, a fellow graduate student at UC Berkeley, who became a widely published scholar in the fields of religion and politics, global studies, and terrorism. She taught at four University of California campuses: Berkeley, Santa Cruz, Santa Barbara, and San Diego (the last as a visiting professor). Now retired from the University of California, Santa Barbara because of the effects of post-polio syndrome, she donated much of her personal papers to the Immigration History Research Center Archives, part of the University of Minnesota Libraries, and has made multiple donations of books from her large personal library to the University of California, Merced. Her personal library includes books in Asian American Studies, Latino/a Studies, African American Studies, global studies, global migrations, sociological theories, U.S. immigration history, California history, and studies about every country in East, Southeast, South, and Central Asia—all of which are topics she has studied, researched, or written about. She was a Guggenheim Fellowship laureate in 1988.

Selected works
1986, "This Bittersweet Soil: The Chinese in California Agriculture, 1860-1910″
1989, "Social and Gender Boundaries in the United States"
1990, "Income and Status Differences Between White and Minority Americans: A Persistent Inequality"
1990, "Quiet Odyssey: A Pioneer Korean Woman in America" by Mary Paik Lee (editor)
1991, "Asian Americans: An Interpretive History"
1991, "Entry Denied: Exclusion and the Chinese Community in America, 1882-1943″
1993, "Peoples of Color in the American West" (co-edited with Douglas Daniels, Mario Barrera, and Terry P. Wilson)
1994, "Hmong Means Free: Life in Laos and America"
1996, "Major Problems in California History" (co-edited with Spencer Olin)
1998, "Claiming America: Constructing Chinese American Identities during the Exclusion Era" (co-edited with K. Scott Wong)
2003, "Not Just Victims: Conversations with Cambodian Community Leaders in the United States"
2003, "Remapping Asian American History"
2004, "Survivors: Cambodian Refugees in the United States"
2005, "Chinese American Transnationalism: The Flow of People, Resources. and Ideas between China and America during the Exclusion Era"
2005, "In Defense of Asian American Studies: The Politics of Teaching and Program Building"
2006, "The Vietnamese American 1.5 Generation: Stories of War, Revolution, Flight, and New Beginnings"
2008, "Chinese Americans and the Politics of Race and Culture" (co-editor with Madeline Hsu)

Awards
1973, National Endowment for the Humanities fellowship for the study of U.S. Minorities
1978, Distinguished Teaching Award, University of California at Berkeley
1984, Best article award, Pacific Historical Review
1986, Theodore Saloutos Memorial Book Award in Agricultural History
1987, Pacific Coast Branch Book Award, American Historical Association
1988, Outstanding Book Award, Association for Asian American Studies
1988, John Simon Guggenheim fellowship
1990, Outstanding Book Award, Association for Asian American Studies
1992, J.S. Holliday award for contributions to California History, California Historical Society
1992, Outstanding Book Award, Gustavus Myers Center for the Study of Civil Rights
1994, Margaret T. Getman Service to Students Award, University of California at Santa Barbara
1997, Lifetime Achievement Award, Association for Asian American Studies
1998, Asian American Faculty and Staff Association's Distinguished Lecturer Award, University of California at Santa Barbara
1998, Distinguished Teaching Award, University of California at Santa Barbara
2001, History and Social Science Book Award, Association for Asian American Studies
2005, Outstanding Academic Title Award, Choice Magazine
2006, History Book Award, Association for Asian American Studies

See also
List of Guggenheim Fellowships awarded in 1988

References

Bibliography

External links 

 Sucheng Chan papers at the Immigration History Research Center Archives, University of Minnesota Libraries.

1941 births
Living people
21st-century American historians
Swarthmore College alumni
University of Hawaiʻi alumni
UC Berkeley College of Letters and Science alumni
University of California, Santa Barbara faculty
Writers from Shanghai
Chinese women writers
Chinese emigrants to the United States
Chinese Civil War refugees
American women historians
21st-century American women